John Leslie Upham (born December 29, 1940) is a former relief pitcher and outfielder in Major League Baseball who played in  and  for the Chicago Cubs. Listed at 6' 0", 180 lb., Upham batted and threw left-handed. He was born in Windsor, Ontario, Canada.

In his first major league season, Upham appeared in 5 games as a relief pitcher, and 3 as a pinch hitter.  He was notably more successful as a pinch hitter (2-for-3) than as a pitcher (33.75 ERA).  All his 3 batting appearances were as a pinch hitter in games where he did not appear as a pitcher, and he did not play a fielding position in those three games.  Although Upham opened the season with the Cubs, he was sent down to the minor leagues in May and did not return to the majors that year.

Over a year later, in August 1968, Upham returned to the big leagues for 13 additional games with the Cubs. This time Upham was primarily used as a pinch hitter and pinch runner, but was also used as an outfielder and as a pitcher—he appeared in two games as pitcher, and in two games as an outfielder.  For one of those outfielding appearances, Upham was a late-inning defensive replacement in left; for the other, he got the start in center field on August 18 and played the entire game at that position.  This made Upham the majors' last "two-way player" (i.e., a player used regularly in non-blowout/non-extra-inning games as a both a pitcher and a fielder in the same season) for 35 years. Brooks Kieschnick was the majors next two-way player, for Milwaukee in 2003.

In a two-season career, Upham was a .308 hitter (4-for-13), scoring one run in 21 games. He did not register an extra-base hit, and did not drive in a run. In seven relief appearances, he posted a 0–1 record with a 5.40 ERA, giving up five earned runs on six hits and five walks while striking out four in 8.1 innings of work.

See also
Major League Baseball players from Canada

References

External links
, or Retrosheet
Pura Pelota (Venezuelan Winter League)

1941 births
Arizona Instructional League Cubs players
Arkansas Travelers players
Bakersfield Bears players
Baseball people from Ontario
Buffalo Bisons (minor league) players
Canadian expatriate baseball players in the United States
Chattanooga Lookouts players
Chicago Cubs players
Dallas–Fort Worth Spurs players
Detroit Mercy Titans baseball players
Eugene Emeralds players
Living people
Major League Baseball outfielders
Major League Baseball pitchers
Major League Baseball players from Canada
Navegantes del Magallanes players
Sportspeople from Windsor, Ontario
Tacoma Cubs players
Tampa Tarpons (1957–1987) players
University of Detroit Mercy alumni
Canadian expatriate baseball players in Venezuela